Kyaukpyu Airport is an airport in Kyaukpyu, Myanmar .

The runway of Kyaukpyu Airport was 4,620 feet long and 100 feet wide. It is able to handle Fokker F28 Fellowship jet aircraft used by Myanma Airways.  It is planned to extend the runway by 1,000 feet in 2011 and 1,400 feet in next two years. After that it will have a length of 7,000 feet (ATR72 capable) and a width of 100 feet. It appears this never happened, in fact as of 2020, its only 2,500 feet, but new attention for runway completion and terminal upgrade.

Airlines and destinations

References

Airports in Myanmar